Nebulosa sirenia is a moth of the family Notodontidae. It is found in Bolivia and south-eastern Peru.

References

Moths described in 1925
Notodontidae of South America